Rimfire may refer to:

 Rimfire (film), a 1949 noir Western
 Rimfire ammunition, a type of firearm cartridge

See also
 Rim Fire, a 2013 wildfire in California
 Rim of fire